This is a list of diplomatic missions of Germany.

The Federal Republic of Germany manages 227 diplomatic missions abroad. Of these, 153 are embassies, 52 consulates-general, 7 consulates, and 12 multilateral missions making it one of the world's largest diplomatic networks.

In addition, there are 337 honorary consuls, which are not included in this list. Furthermore, Germany maintains a representative office in Ramallah and an institute in Taipei, which serves as de facto embassies to the State of Palestine and Taiwan, respectively.

When in a non-EU country where there is no German embassy, German citizens as EU citizens have the right to get consular protection from the embassy of any other EU country present in that country.

History
Historically, the German state of Prussia and several smaller German states had sent emissaries abroad prior to the establishment of the North German Confederation, the precursor to the modern Federal Republic of Germany.

In 1874, Germany had only four embassies (in London, Paris, Saint Petersburg, and Vienna), but this was complemented by non-ambassadorial representation in the form of 14 ministerial posts (in Athens, Bern, Brussels, The Hague, Constantinople, Copenhagen, Lisbon, Madrid, Rome, Stockholm, Peking, Rio de Janeiro, Washington, D.C., and to the Holy See), seven consulates-general with diplomatic status (in Alexandria, Belgrade, Bucharest, London, New York City, Budapest, and Warsaw), and 37 consulates and vice-consulates headed by consular officers. By 1914, five additional embassies were established in Constantinople, Madrid, Rome, Washington, D.C., and Tokyo. The Foreign Office progressively reformed itself at this time to serve Germany's rising commercial and colonial interests abroad, as well as to reflect the professionalization of diplomacy generally.

Politics of the Third Reich affected the Foreign Office. In 1935 the Reich Citizenship Act led to the forced retirement of over 120 tenured civil servants. Positions and structures were created to imbed NSDAP representatives, and the SS began to be posted abroad as "police attachés". Under Joachim von Ribbentrop the Reich Foreign Ministry grew from 2,665 officers in 1938 to a peak of 6,458 in 1943, despite missions abroad closing as a consequence of the Second World War.

Germany's post-war diplomatic network started as early as 1949 with a mission in Paris to the newly formed Organisation for Economic Co-operation and Development. The following year consulates-general were (re)opened in London, New York City, Paris, Istanbul, Amsterdam, Brussels, Rome, and Athens (until 1951 these were not embassies, as by virtue of the Occupation Statute the three allied powers had competence of foreign affairs; these consulates were intended to just manage commercial & consular affairs). West Germany's Federal Foreign Office grew, and by the time of Germany's reunification in 1990, there were 214 diplomatic missions abroad. Following German reunification, the Federal Republic inherited several diplomatic representations of the Ministry for Foreign Affairs of former East Germany.

The West German embassy in Stockholm was occupied by the Red Army Faction in 1975. In 1989 its embassies in Budapest and Prague sheltered fleeing East Germans while waiting for permission to travel onwards to West Germany; permission was subsequently given by the Czechoslovakian and Hungarian governments, accelerating the collapse of socialist hegemony in Eastern Europe.

Current missions

Africa

Americas

Asia

Europe 

 Lefkoşa (Embassy Office)

Oceania

Multilateral organisations

Closed missions

Africa

Americas

Asia

Europe

Oceania

Travel warnings and "Krisenvorsorgeliste"
Germany regularly publishes travel warnings on the website of the Auswärtiges Amt (Federal Foreign Office) to its citizens. The Office allows German citizens to register online in a special list, the Krisenvorsorgeliste ("Crisis-Prevention List") before they travel abroad (Elektronische Erfassung von Deutschen im Ausland [ELEFAND] Electronic Registration of Germans Being Abroad). With a password, the registered persons can change or update their data. The registration is voluntary and free of charge. It can be used for longer stays (longer than 3 months), but also for a vacation of only two weeks. The earliest date of registration is 10 days before the planned trip.

See also
 Foreign relations of Germany
 List of diplomatic missions in Germany

Notes

References

External links

 Foreign Office of the Federal Republic of Germany

 
Diplomatic missions
Germany